The Ant Flat Ranger Station is a site on the National Register of Historic Places located 2 miles south of Fortine, Montana in Kootenai National Forest.  It was added to the Register on December 30, 1996.

It includes modern and historical buildings, with the latter in a cluster.  It includes an office/warehouse building, Building #2216, a two-story wood-frame building constructed in 1927.  It includes Building #2300, a warehouse built in 1934 as a garage and shop.

References

Park buildings and structures on the National Register of Historic Places in Montana
National Register of Historic Places in Lincoln County, Montana
Government buildings completed in 1927
1927 establishments in Montana
Kootenai National Forest
United States Forest Service ranger stations